Eric Sturgess and Sheila Summers were the defending champions but Summers did not compete. Sturgess partnered with Louise Brough and they defeated Geoff Brown and Pat Todd in the final, 11–9, 1–6, 6–4 to win the mixed doubles tennis title at the 1950 Wimbledon Championships.

Seeds

  Eric Sturgess /  Louise Brough (champions)
  Bill Talbert /  Margaret duPont (fourth round)
  Frank Sedgman /  Doris Hart (semifinals)
  Geoff Brown /  Pat Todd (final)

Draw

Finals

Top half

Section 1

Section 2

Section 3

Section 4

Bottom half

Section 5

Section 6

Section 7

Section 8

References

External links

X=Mixed Doubles
Wimbledon Championship by year – Mixed doubles